Zhang Junhong may refer to:

Chang Chun-hung (born 1938), Taiwanese politician
Cheong Jun Hoong (born 1990), Malaysian diver